Laureana Franco (4 July 1936 – 7 October 2011) known as Ka Luring Franco was a Filipino Roman Catholic catechist and member of the Legion of Mary who devoted her life to serving her local diocese  and its poor. She is a candidate for beatification.

Biography
Laureana Franco was born on 4 July 1936, in Hagonoy, Taguig, southwest of Manila, into a poor family. Aside from being the eldest of eight children, very little is known about her childhood and family background. Her parents were exceptionally pious and taught the Catholic faith to their children.

At a young age, she became a member of the Legion of Mary, where she developed a strong devotion to the Blessed Mother. Through experience with work assignments for the Legion, she became a dedicated catechist and found the vocation to which she devoted her life. In the entire Archdiocese of Manila, she was one of the only two women given permission to distribute Holy Communion.

After struggling patiently with cancer, she died on 17 October 2011.

Awards
On 1 April 1990, through the recommendation of Cardinal Jaime Sin, Franco received the Pro Ecclesia et Pontifice award from Pope John Paul II for her exemplary service as a lay catechist.

In 2002, she received the Mother Teresa Award, a project of AY Foundation Inc. and the Manila Jaycees, for her work with the poor and needy.

Cause of beatification and canonization
In October 2020, Bishop Mylo Hubert Vergara of Pasig Diocese announced that Franco's cause for beatification will formally commence in 2021 in line with the 500th anniversary of Christianity of the Philippines.

References

1936 births
2011 deaths
Filipino Roman Catholics
Filipino Servants of God
People from Taguig
21st-century venerated Christians